Playgrounds of the Mind is a collection of short stories by American writer  Larry Niven, published in 1991. It is the sequel to N-Space.

Many of the stories are set in Niven's Known Space universe. There are also excerpts from his The Magic Goes Away novel series, as well as several stories from his The Draco Tavern setting (an alien bar) and other sources.

Contents

 "Thraxisp: A Memoir"
 "A Teardrop Falls"
 From Inferno (with Jerry Pournelle)
 From A World Out of Time
 "Rammer"
 From "The Ethics of Madness"
 "Becalmed in Hell"
 "Wait It Out"
 "A Relic of the Empire"
 From Lucifer's Hammer (with Jerry Pournelle)
 "The Soft Weapon"
 "The Borderland of Sol"
 From The Ringworld Engineers
 "What Good Is a Glass Dagger?"
 From The Magic Goes Away
 "The Defenseless Dead"
 From The Patchwork Girl
 "Leviathan!"
 From Oath of Fealty (with Jerry Pournelle)
 Unfinished Story
 "Cautionary Tales"
 "The Dreadful White Page"
 From Dream Park (with Steven Barnes)
 "Retrospective"
 "The Green Marauder"
 "Assimilating Our Culture, That's What They're Doing!"
 "War Movie"
 "Limits"
 "The Lost Ideas"
 "Bigger Than Worlds"
 "Ghetto? But I Thought..."
 "Adrienne and Irish Coffee"
 "One Night at the Draco Tavern"
 "TrantorCon Report"
 "Why Men Fight Wars, and What You Can Do About It!"
 Comics
 From Green Lantern Bible
 Criticism
 From The Legacy of Heorot (with Jerry Pournelle and Steven Barnes)
 "The Portrait of Daryanree the King"
 "The Wishing Game"
 "The Lion In His Attic"
 From Footfall (with Jerry Pournelle)
 Works in Progress
 From The Moat Around Murcheson's Eye
 From Fallen Angels
 "Wanted Fan"
 [from] The California Voodoo Game
 "Letter"

Notes
 A Teardrop Falls is set in Fred Saberhagen's Berserker universe.
 The Soft Weapon was adapted into an episode of Star Trek: The Animated Series called "The Slaver Weapon".
 TrantorCon Report is a humorous article about planning a science fiction convention 20,000 years from now on the planet Trantor (from Isaac Asimov's Empire series), with guests from every fictional universe. Tickets must be reserved in advance.
 The Portrait of Daryanree the King is loosely based on The Picture of Dorian Gray, by Oscar Wilde.

1991 short story collections
Short story collections by Larry Niven
Tor Books books